Günther's toadlet (Pseudophryne guentheri) is a species of frog in the family Myobatrachidae.
It is endemic to Australia.
Its natural habitats are temperate forests, temperate shrubland, Mediterranean-type shrubby vegetation, intermittent rivers, swamps, intermittent freshwater marshes, arable land, and pastureland.

References

Pseudophryne
Amphibians of Western Australia
Taxonomy articles created by Polbot
Amphibians described in 1882
Frogs of Australia